Angus J Wilkinson is a professor of materials science based at University of Oxford. He is a specialist in micromechanics, electron microscopy and crystal plasticity. He assists in overseeing the MicroMechanics group while focusing on the fundamentals of material deformation. He developed the HR-EBSD method for mapping stress and dislocation density at high spatial resolution used at the micron scale in mechanical testing  and micro-cantilevers to extract data on mechanical properties that are relevant to materials engineering.

Selected publications 

 Wilkinson AJ, Meaden G, Dingley DJ. High-resolution elastic strain measurement from electron backscatter diffraction patterns: New levels of sensitivity. Ultramicroscopy 2006;106:307–13. https://doi.org/10.1016/j.ultramic.2005.10.001.
 Wilkinson AJ, Hirsch PB. Electron diffraction based techniques in scanning electron microscopy of bulk materials. Micron 1997;28:279–308. https://doi.org/10.1016/S0968-4328(97)00032-2.
 Wilkinson AJ, Britton T. Strains, planes, and EBSD in materials science. Materials Today 2012;15:366–76. https://doi.org/10.1016/S1369-7021(12)70163-3.
 Wilkinson AJ, Randman D. Determination of elastic strain fields and geometrically necessary dislocation distributions near nanoindents using electron back scatter diffraction. Philosophical Magazine 2010;90:1159–77. https://doi.org/10.1080/14786430903304145.
 Guo Y, Britton TB, Wilkinson AJ. Slip band–grain boundary interactions in commercial-purity titanium. Acta Mater 2014;76:1–12. https://doi.org/10.1016/J.ACTAMAT.2014.05.015.
 Britton TB, Wilkinson AJ. High resolution electron backscatter diffraction measurements of elastic strain variations in the presence of larger lattice rotations. Ultramicroscopy 2012;114:82–95. https://doi.org/10.1016/J.ULTRAMIC.2012.01.004.
 Zhai T, Wilkinson AJ, Martin JW. A crystallographic mechanism for fatigue crack propagation through grain boundaries. Acta Mater 2000;48:4917–27. https://doi.org/10.1016/S1359-6454(00)00214-7.

See also 

 Department of Materials, University of Oxford
 Electron backscatter diffraction
 Ultramicroscopy

References

External links 
 Angus Wilkinson at Department of Materials, University of Oxford
 
 Angus Wilkinson at Research.com.

Living people
Microscopists
Academics of the University of Oxford
British materials scientists
Year of birth missing (living people)
Metallurgists